Biela's Comet or Comet Biela (official designation: 3D/Biela) was a periodic Jupiter-family comet first recorded in 1772 by Montaigne and Messier and finally identified as periodic in 1826 by Wilhelm von Biela.  It was subsequently observed to split in two and has not been seen since 1852. As a result, it is currently considered to have been destroyed, although remnants appeared to have survived for some time as a meteor shower, the Andromedids.

Discovery 
The comet was first recorded on 8 March 1772 by Jacques Leibax Montaigne; during the same apparition it was independently discovered by Charles Messier. It was also recorded in 1805 by Jean-Louis Pons, but was not recognized as the same object. After the 1805 apparition a number of attempts were made by Gauss (1806) and Bessel (1806) to calculate a definitive orbit. Gauss and Olbers both noted a similarity between the 1805 and 1772 comets but they were not able to prove a link.

Confirmation as periodic

It was Wilhelm von Biela, an army officer serving at the fortress town of Josefstadt, who observed the comet during its 1826 perihelion approach (on February 27) and calculated its orbit, discovering it to be periodic with a period of 6.6 years.  At the time it was only the third comet known to be periodic, after comets Halley and Encke. The comet was named after Biela, although there was initially some controversy due to a later but independent discovery by Jean-Félix Adolphe Gambart, who also provided the first mathematical proof linking the 1826 and 1805 comets (letters from Biela and Gambart were published in the same issue of the Astronomische Nachrichten). A third claim was made by Thomas Clausen, who had independently linked the comets.

The comet appeared as predicted during its 1832 apparition, when it was first recovered by John Herschel on 24 September. The orbital elements and ephemeris calculated by Olbers for this return created something of a popular sensation, as they showed that the comet's coma would likely pass through the Earth's orbit during a close approach on October 29. Subsequent predictions, in the media of the time, of the Earth's likely destruction overlooked the fact that the Earth itself would not reach this point until November 30, a month later, as pointed out by François Arago in an article designed to allay public fears. Despite this, the fact that Biela's Comet was the only comet known to intersect the Earth's orbit was to make it of particular interest, both to astronomers and the public, during the 19th century.

In 1832, Greek-Austrian astronomer Georgios Konstantinos Vouris published his own calculations of the elliptical orbit of the comet entitled: Elliptical orbit calculation of Biela's Comet from 96 observations of the year 1832 (Elliptische bahnbere chung des Biela'schen cometen aus 96 beobachtungen des Jahres 1832). His article was a comprehensive overview of the elliptical orbital of Biela's Comet.

The 1839 apparition was extremely unfavourable and no observations were made as the comet never came closer than 1.8 AU from Earth since the comet was on the other side of the Sun. During 1839 the comet never had a solar elongation greater than 50 degrees.

Disintegration 
The comet was rediscovered on November 26, 1845, by Francesco de Vico. Initially sporting small, faint nebulousness, subsequent observations showed that something remarkable had happened to it. Matthew Fontaine Maury, observing on 14 January 1846, noted that an apparent companion was located 1 arc minute north of the comet. After this announcement many astronomers began observing the comet, and noted that the two elements (usually referred to as "Comet A" and "Comet B" in modern nomenclature) alternated in brightness, developing parallel tails as they approached perihelion. Some observations indicated an "archway of cometary matter" extending between the two nuclei, which might suggest that the comet had split into many more pieces than two, but were simply too faint to be observed individually.

In 1852, the comet was again rediscovered more or less as predicted, with "Comet A" being rediscovered first, by Angelo Secchi on August 26. "Comet B" was finally relocated on September 16, and once again both nuclei alternated in brightness during the period of observation. "A" was last detected on this apparition on September 26 and "B" on September 29, in both cases by Otto Wilhelm Struve. Subsequent orbital calculations indicated that the nuclei had probably split around 500 days before the 1845 apparition, though more recent work has determined that it may have occurred near aphelion in late 1842.

Neither part could be found on their predicted periodic returns in 1859 (in any case an unfavorable return for viewing), 1865, or 1872. However, on November 27, 1872, a brilliant meteor shower (3,000 per hour) was observed radiating from the part of the sky where the comet had been predicted to cross in September 1872. This was the date when Earth intersected the comet's trajectory. These meteors became known as the Andromedids or "Bielids" and it seems apparent that they were produced by the breakup of the comet.  The meteors were seen again on subsequent occasions for the rest of the 19th century, but have now faded away, probably due to gravitational disruption of the main filaments.

Possible observations and searches

There were, however, inconclusive observations during the 1865 and 1872 returns. Charles Talmage, using ephemerides provided by John Russell Hind, claimed to have briefly observed a nebulous object in approximately the right position in November 1865. James Buckingham also observed two nebulosities in 1865 after studying Hind's predictions, but Hind subsequently stated that they were unlikely to be Biela's Comet, as they were much closer together than the two components of the comet should have been. A puzzling observation recorded as X/1872 X1, seen by N. R. Pogson in late 1872 from the Madras Observatory, was also speculated to be a recovery of Biela's Comet, though once again this was later shown to have been unlikely.

Despite the apparent destruction of the comet, there were a number of searches for it during the later 20th century. Brian G. Marsden and Zdeněk Sekanina attempted to calculate a likely orbit for any remaining parts of the comet; it was during a search using Marsden's calculations that Luboš Kohoutek discovered Comet Kohoutek. It has been calculated that the mass of the debris left in the Andromedid meteor stream is still much less than the total mass of the comet. Given that it is more likely that the main mass loss occurred near aphelion before the 1845 apparition, it seems possible that fragment A at least may still exist as a 'dormant' comet.

There have been several attempts to identify objects discovered subsequently either as Biela's Comet or as a remnant of it. The German astronomer Karl Ristenpart attempted several times to prove a link with the comet now known as 18D/Perrine-Mrkos, which had a very similar orbit to Biela apart from a differing Argument of Perihelion. Despite this, it was not possible to prove any relationship and Perrine-Mrkos, an intrinsically faint object, has itself since been lost. Comet 207P/NEAT (P/2001 J1), discovered in 2001 by the NEAT asteroid survey, was also found to have a similar orbit to Biela's Comet, and it was initially thought possible that it was in some way related to it.

Meteoric impacts 

Biela has sometimes been proposed as the source of meteoric impacts on Earth.

A fringe theory links together several major fires that occurred simultaneously in America, including the Great Chicago Fire, the Great Michigan Fire, and the Peshtigo Fire, claiming that they were caused by fragments of Biela's Comet striking the Earth, in October 1871. The theory was first proposed by Ignatius L. Donnelly in 1883, and was revived in a 1985 book and further explored in an unpublished 2004 scientific paper. However, experts dispute such a scenario - meteorites in fact are cold to the touch when they reach the Earth's surface, and there are no credible reports of any fire anywhere having been started by a meteorite. Given the low tensile strength of such bodies, if a fragment of an icy comet were to strike the Earth, the most likely outcome would be for it to disintegrate in the upper atmosphere, leading to a meteor air burst.

On November 27, 1885, an iron meteorite fell in northern Mexico, at the same time as a 15,000 per hour outburst of the Andromedid meteor shower.  The Mazapil meteorite has sometimes been attributed to the comet, but this idea has been out of favor since the 1950s as the processes of differentiation required to produce an iron body are not believed to occur in comets.

Importance in the history of the concept of luminiferous ether

Biela's Comet (and Comet Encke) had a role in the now-discredited concept of luminiferous aether: its orbit was found to be shrinking in size, which was ascribed to the drag of an ether through which it orbited.

References

External links 

3D at Gary W. Kronk's Cometography
Comet 3D/Biela orbital simulation from JPL (Java)
3D/Biela at CometBase database by Neil Norman
3D/Biela – Minor Planet Center
Comet P/2001 J1 (NEAT) orbital simulation from JPL (Java)
Importance in history of luminiferous aether, search for Biela's Comet

Destroyed comets
17720308
17720308
0003
Periodic comets
003P
Meteor shower progenitors